"Zerox" is a song written by Adam Ant from Adam and the Ants' debut album Dirk Wears White Sox. Adam's ever changing line-up of Ants on this track include Dave Barbarossa on drums, Matthew Ashman on guitar & Andy Warren on bass guitar. The track has been included on the compilations Antics in the Forbidden Zone, Antmusic: The Very Best of Adam Ant, The Very Best Of Adam And The Ants, Antbox, The Essential Adam Ant & Stand & Deliver: The Very Best of Adam & the Ants.

The cover portrays Image in Motion (1913), a photograph by the Italian Futurist Anton Bragaglia, with the name of the band and the song superimposed over it.

Lyrics
The title is a reference to the Xerox photocopier. Whereas Xerox machines are used to make paper copies of documents and other visual images, it is used as a metaphor for plagiarism in the song's lyrics (example: I'm never bored, I'll steal your chords).

The title also reference's David Bowie's description of himself as "a human Xerox Machine".  On some early versions of the song, Ant can be heard singing "David Bowie's a Xerox machine" on the coda.  In one such version, a demo recorded August 1978 at Decca Records's Broadhurst Gardens studio, this line is sung in a similar high pitched tone to that employed on Bowie's early single "The Laughing Gnome".

Promotion
The song was an early favourite among 'Antpeople', and was performed at a John Peel session on 10 July 1978. Adam and the Ants signed with Camden-based independent record label Do It Records after leaving Decca Records. Do It had the band in the studio almost immediately after signing, with "Zerox" being the result.

The band had developed a strong cult following and embarked on a major UK tour prior to the single's release on 6 July 1979. Do It, meanwhile, did a series of UK music press advertisements. It was the band's second single. A music video, "Zerox Machine" was partially made in December 1979 and the surviving material, including one complete take of Ant miming the song, represented the song on the 2006 DVD compilation Stand and Deliver.

The song was a number one hit on the UK Indie Chart, but failed to chart on the UK Singles Chart upon its initial release. Following the success of their second album, Kings of the Wild Frontier, it reached number 45 in January 1981 upon re-release.

"Whip in My Valise"
The B-side of the single first appeared in the Ants' set as a fast-tempo song circa August 1977. When Matthew Ashman joined the band in June 1978, it was rearranged to a slow tempo (except for the middle eight which remained fast.)  This new arrangement was recorded as a demo at Decca Studios in Broadhurst Gardens, London in August 1978 and then rerecorded for the B-side at the Roundhouse session the following May. A new arrangement at a medium-fast tempo was unveiled at the final gig of the original Ants at the Electric Ballroom, Camden on 31 December 1979, but after this the song did not appear in Ant's live repertoire until 2010, once again using the slow arrangement.

Different versions of the 7" single
Despite the fact that "Whip in My Valise" is credited as the single's B-side, 2000 copies of the single pressed in July 1980 instead have the song "Physical" (a version later featured on The B Sides single and Antmusic EP). This was done at the instruction of Do It chief Ian Tregoning who liked this recording. His enthusiasm was not shared by Ant, who later that year re-recorded the song and put it out on the B-side of his second single for CBS Records, "Dog Eat Dog", on which Ant can be heard saying, "Eat your heart out Do It! You can't do it, can ya?"

The song "Zerox" was originally entitled "I'm a Xerox Machine", and was intended to be the second of two singles for Decca Records, with Kick as the B-side. These versions were recorded November 1978 at RAK Studios, produced by Snips. Ant planned to include the band's "Antmanifesto" as an insert with the single. For the eventual release of "Zerox", these recordings were discarded in favour of the May 1979 Roundhouse recording. A spoof Decca label for the A-side, under the title "Zerox Machine (I'm A)" was printed in issue 3 of Ant fanzine Antics in the 90s in 1993.

Client version

English electronic group Client cover "Zerox" on their third studio album, Heartland (2007). Released as the album's second single, it is their first release since they parted ways with Toast Hawaii. Client calls their version of the song "Zerox Machine."

Track listings
UK 7" single (LFS05)
A. "Zerox Machine" – 4:05
B. "Zerox Machine" (Jonny Slut/Atomizermix) – 4:43

UK 12" single (LFSX05)
A. "Zerox Machine" (N-Joi Remix) – 7:05
B. "Zerox Machine" (IDC Remix) – 5:00

U.S. CD single (MET 470)
"Zerox Machine"
"Loosetalking"
"Zerox Machine" (IDC Mix)
"Zerox Machine" (Jonny Slut/Atomizermix)
"Zerox Machine" (Robert Görl Strange Pistol Mix) – 3:32
"Zerox Machine" (Club Mix by Covenant)

German promo CD single (LTD 21)
"Zerox Machine" (Edit) – 4:14
"Zerox Machine" (Terence Fixmer Remix) – 5:33
"Zerox Machine" (Covenant Remix) – 4:25
"Zerox Machine" (Robert Görl Strange Pistol Mix) – 3:32

Charts

References

External links

Songs written by Adam Ant
1978 songs
1979 singles
1981 singles
2007 singles
UK Independent Singles Chart number-one singles
Adam and the Ants songs
Client (band) songs